Andrew Penman may refer to:

 Andrew Penman (journalist), Daily Mirror reporter and part of the Penman and Sommerlad and Penman & Greenwood investigation teams
 Andrew Penman, guitarist with the band Salmonella Dub